The International Society for Biological and Environmental Repositories (ISBER) is a professional society of individuals and organizations involved in biospecimen banking. Its main activities include  creating educational and training opportunities, providing an online forum service, showcasing related products and services, and creating opportunities for networking. It also has published works.

Membership
Membership includes organizations and individuals from over 30 countries involved in long-term preservation and storage of animal, environmental, human, microorganism culture, museum, and plant/seed collections. A complete list of members is available on the ISBER website.

Meetings
ISBER holds one international meeting each year. Lectures, workshops, poster presentations, and working group discussions focus on technical issues and challenges such as quality assurance and control, regulations, human subject privacy and confidentiality issues, and provide information about sources of equipment and expertise.

ISBER Annual Meeting Locations 
 May 7-10, 2019 - Shanghai, China
May 20-24, 2018 - Dallas, TX, USA
May 9-12, 2017 - Toronto, ONT, Canada
May 20–24, 2014 - Orlando, FL, USA
 2013 - Sydney, NSW, Australia
 2012 - Vancouver, BC, Canada
 2011 - Arlington, VA, USA
 2010 - Rotterdam, SH, Netherlands
 2009 - Portland, OR, USA
 2008 - Bethesda, MD, USA
 2007 - Singapore
 2006 - Bethesda, MD, USA
 2005 - Bellevue, WA, USA
 2004 - New York, NY, USA

Best Practices
The ISBER Best Practices are publications periodically reviewed and revised to reflect advances in research and technology. The fourth edition (2018) of the Best Practices builds on the foundation established in the first, second, and third editions which were published in 2005, 2008, and 2012 respectively. The fifth edition is currently being written.

Current Best Practices 
ISBER Best Practices: Recommendations for Repositories provides repository professionals with standardized guidelines for the management of biobank specimen collections and repositories.  The most current version of the ISBER Best Practices was published in Biopreservation and Biobanking (BIO), February 2018 issue.

Self-Assessment Tool (SAT)

SAT Information 
This testing tool allows individuals to evaluate their knowledge of the Best Practices. It contains 158 questions which may be answered in a single or multiple sessions. Each page of the survey corresponds to a section of the ISBER Best Practices. Results from pilot tests indicated that the SAT takes about hour to complete, if all information is available at the time of completing the survey. The tool is free to ISBER members, but non-members may participate for a fee.

After completion of the SAT, a personalized e-mail is sent to the participant which includes a "risk-balanced assessment score" and notification of top deviation areas to help the participant evaluate how their current practices conform to the ISBER Best Practices. The score is based on possible risk to the specimens, frequency of implementation of each practice, and the ease with which deviations can be detected.

Biorepository Proficiency Testing Program
Developed in collaboration with the Integrated Biobank of Luxembourg (IBBL), the Biorepository Proficiency Testing Program is designed to allow biorepositories to assess the accuracy of their quality control assays and characterization of biospecimens.  Participants can compare their results with those obtained in other laboratories and can identify testing issues that may be related to individual staff performance or calibration of instrumentation used in biospecimen quality control.  The program provides guidance to biorepositories so they can take appropriate remedial action to be in compliance with ISO/IEC 17043:2010, providing a necessary External Quality Assessment tool for biorepositories who wish to seek accreditation (ISO 17025, CLIA or equivalent).

References

External links

Environmental organizations based in British Columbia
Biorepositories
Biobank organizations
Organizations based in Vancouver
Professional associations based in Canada